In the 1949–50 season, USM Blida is competing in the Division Honneur for the 17th season French colonial era, as well as the Forconi Cup.

Pre-season

Friendly

Competitions

Overview

Goalscorers
Includes all competitive matches. The list is sorted alphabetically by surname when total goals are equal.

Transfers

In

Out

References
l'Echo d'Alger 1949
l'Echo d'Oran 1955 

USM Blida seasons
Algerian football clubs 1949–50 season